Boromville, also known as Borom, is an unincorporated community in Macon County, Alabama, United States.

History
The community of Boromville grew up around the site of Fort Bainbridge, which was located on the Federal Road. A post office operated under the name Borom from 1894 to 1917.

References

Unincorporated communities in Macon County, Alabama
Unincorporated communities in Alabama